Gymnascella dankaliensis is a moderate to slow growing fungus commonly found in the soil of warmer climates. It is characterized by round yellow, orange or red-brown ascospores encircled by undifferentiated filaments. They have been found in ear, nail and skin infections. Their metabolites have been isolated and shown to have cytotoxic and anti-tumor properties .

Morphology 

Colonies vary greatly in colour, texture and growth rate. Colonies first appear white, then turn a pale yellow or olive and as they mature become yellow-brown to orange brown. The texture can be either cottony, fine, knotted or wispy. Growth rate of colonies varies from moderately slow to rapid.

Gymnascella dankaliensis has irregular, indistinct filaments.

Ecology 
Gymnascella dankaliensis has been reported in the soil of climates and the marine sponge Halichondria japonica.

Metabolites 
Since the late 1990s, multiple cytotoxic compounds have been isolated from Gymnascella dankaliensis such as:

References 

Onygenales